The Tempa Rossa oil field is an oil field located in the Southern Apennines in Italy. It was discovered in 1989 and developed by TotalEnergies. It is expected to begin production in 2016 and will produce oil and gas.

On March 18, 2013, Total finalized an agreement to sell 25% of its shares in the oil field to Mitsui E&P Italia A S.r.l.

References

Oil fields in Italy